Daniel Riazat (born 1991) is a Swedish politician.  he serves as Member of the Riksdag. He is affiliated with the Left Party. He represented the constituency of Dalarna County from 2014 to 2022 and since 2022 he represents Stockholm County.

He was re-elected as Member of the Riksdag in September 2018 and September 2022.

References 

Living people
1991 births
Place of birth missing (living people)
21st-century Swedish politicians
Members of the Riksdag 2014–2018
Members of the Riksdag 2018–2022
Members of the Riksdag 2022–2026
Members of the Riksdag from the Left Party (Sweden)
Swedish politicians of Iranian descent